Interaction Design Institute Ivrea (also known as Interaction Ivrea or IDII) was a two-year graduate program in the field of Interaction Design operating in the town of Ivrea, in Northern Italy. It was based in the former Olivetti Study and Research Centre, sometimes referred to as Casa Blu, designed by Eduardo Vittorio in 1955.

History
The Interaction Design Institute Ivrea Association was founded on 16 June 2000 by Telecom Italia and Olivetti, with its headquarters in Ivrea, with the first class of students arriving in 2001. The founding director of the school was Gillian Crampton Smith until 2005. The school's mission was described in Blueprint  as:
"While following in the spirit of the CRD course, Ivrea will explore business in addition to design and technology. Crampton Smith believes that today there is an 'art' in imagining new business models, and is also aware that, partly because of their broad education, design graduates often move into strategic roles in companies and need to be equipped to learn for themselves."

Among the academic advisors of Interaction Ivrea were leading practitioners and theorists like John Maeda, Ranjit Makkuni, Joy Mountford, John Thackara, Bill Verplank, Nathan Shedroff, Bill Moggridge (co-founder of IDEO) and David Liddle (co-founder of Interval Research).

While the institute also did a measure of outside consulting work and hosted visiting researchers, its main activity was the Interaction Design Master course, a 2-year unaccredited course which graduated 56 students.

Closure 
The school operated between 2001 and 2006 after its initial 5-year endowment from Telecom Italia ended and wasn't renewed. Gillian Crampton-Smith resigned as Director a result of the announcement, and Neil Churcher and Heather Martin became co-directors during the final academic year when the institute was moved to Milan to be in the same building as Domus Academy, another Telecom Italia investment. The curriculum was subsequently merged with Domus's Interaction Design course and IDII's operation ceased in 2007. Its exhibition design unit (E1) was spun off to form an independent company, Interaction Design Lab, currently operating in Milan.  The original program website was archived.

Notable works 
The institute was the birthplace of products like the electronics prototyping boards Wiring and Arduino, the graphics software prototyping environment Processing (started at the MIT Media Lab), the CICCIO inflatable environment, and the connected product Good Night Lamp, which is included in the permanent collection of the London Design Museum. Interaction Ivrea student work was exhibited at the Victoria and Albert's museum in London and at Salone del Mobile in Milan. Publications include the Interaction Design Primer design manual. It was also part of the Convivio Network of Excellence European research project.

Legacy 
Despite its brief lifespan and limited overall number of students and researchers, the institute had an outsize impact on the field of interaction design.

Alumni and ex-faculty have worked in places like Uber, Microsoft, Apple, IDEO, and frog design, or continued to teach in institutions like NABA, Domus Academy, Università Iuav di Venezia, VCU, the Delft University of Technology, the Centro Metropolitano de Diseño of the City of Buenos Aires , and the University of Applied Sciences Potsdam. Some started their own company like CuteCircuit.

Alumni and former staff members set up the Copenhagen Institute of Interaction Design in 2006, with elements of the pedagogic approach based on that from IDII.

References

Design schools
Higher education in Italy
Ivrea
Arduino